Kearny Airport may refer to:
                   
Kearny Airport (Arizona), an airport located near Kearny, Pinal County, Arizona, United States
Kearney Regional Airport, an airport near Kearney, Buffalo County, Nebraska, United States